The year 564 BC was a year of the pre-Julian Roman calendar. In the Roman Empire, it was known as year 190 Ab urbe condita. The denomination 564 BC for this year has been used since the early medieval period, when the Anno Domini calendar era became the prevalent method in Europe for naming years.

Events

Births

Deaths
 Aesop, Greek fable writer
 Arrhichion, Greek champion in pankration (martial arts) in the ancient Olympic Games

References